The Commissions of Sewers Act 1708 (7 Ann c 33), sometimes called the Commissioners of Sewers Act 1708, was an Act of the Parliament of Great Britain. It concerned the duties of boards of commissioners with responsibility for the maintenance of sea banks and other defences, which protected low-lying areas from inundation by the sea, and the removal of obstructions in streams and rivers caused by mills, weirs and gates. The word sewer had a much broader meaning than in modern usage, and referred generally to streams and watercourses.

The main legislation dealing with land drainage in Britain was the Statute of Sewers (23 Hen 8 c 5), which had been passed by King Henry VIII in 1531, and sought to make the powers of various commissions of sewers permanent, whereas previously, each parliament had to renew their powers. Amendments had been made during the reigns of Edward VI and Elizabeth I, and this Act passed during the reign of Queen Anne was similar, in that it left the main powers of Henry's Act in place.

The whole Act was repealed by section 83(1) of, and Schedule 7 to, the Land Drainage Act 1930, although any commissioners acting under the powers of the 1708 Act were deemed to be a properly-constituted internal drainage board under the terms of the new Act. There were 49 commissions of sewers still operative when the 1930 Act was passed.

References

Bibliography

Halsbury's Statutes

 (British Library reprint)
  

Great Britain Acts of Parliament 1708
Land drainage in the United Kingdom
Commissioners for sewers